Oli Brown is a British blues guitarist and singer-songwriter. He has released three studio albums and one live album.

History

Brown was signed to the German blues label, Ruf Records, in January 2008. He released his debut album, Open Road, in July 2008 to good reviews.

Oli's second album, Heads I Win Tails You Lose, was released in 2010, and was produced by Mike Vernon. In the same year, Brown made his debut at the Glastonbury Festival. Classic Rock magazine voted Heads I Win Tails You Lose the number 3 blues album of 2010. Mojo voted it the number 4 blues album of 2010.

At the 2010 British Blues Awards, Brown was named 'Best Male Vocalist' and 'Best Young Artist'.

In the 2011 British Blues Awards, Brown won the 'Best Band' category and Heads I Win Tails You Lose was named 'Best Album'. He was also runner up in the 'Best Male Vocalist', 'Best Guitarist' and 'Best Young Artist' categories.

Following a 25 date tour of the UK as the opening act for John Mayall, Mayall asked Brown to step into the lead guitarist role of his band, when Rocky Athas was unable to attend the Indonesian Blues Festival in December 2011.

Brown's third album Here I Am was released on 23 April 2012, and featured Scott Barnes (bass), Wayne Proctor (drums and percussion) and Joel White (keyboards) with guest performances by Dani Wilde and Paul Jones. Here I Am was number one in the Amazon, HMV and iTunes blues charts and was released in the United States in June 2012. Brown was nominated for Best Guitarist and Best Young Artist in the 2012 British Blues Awards.

On 3 June 2013, at the Grand Rex in Paris, he opened for Joe Satriani and released a live album, entitled Songs From The Road on 14 June 2013.

In 2014 he formed rock trio RavenEye with bassist Aaron Spiers and drummer Kev Hickman.

In 2022, Brown announced new project 'Oli Brown & The Dead Collective'. He also contributed to the album Recipe For Change by UK rock band The Mentulls, adding backing vocals.

Equipment

Brown uses a Hamm-tone Rail-car electric guitar, built from an old C.P. Rail car floor board and a neck from black walnut that was struck down by lightning in 1978, it is equipped with Filtertron pickups and a proprietary secondary pickup which can double as a bass guitar.  He also uses frankenstein telecaster he fashioned together himself using choice parts, a Taylor acoustic guitar and a Hofner hollowbody electric.  One other guitar he uses is a personal signature edition of the "Legend" solid-body electric guitar by Vanquish Guitars. The guitar features two P90 Humbucker-sized pickups and a combination of Tune-o-matic bridge and Stop-Tailpiece. Brown usually uses a Blackstar Combo Amp and Shure Beta 58A Microphones. He also uses an Volt Overdrive Super OB100.

Discography
Open Road (2008) Ruf Records – RUF 1139
Heads I Win, Tails You Lose (2010) Ruf Records – RUF 1160
Here I Am (2012) Ruf Records – RUF 1178
Songs From The Road (2013) Ruf Records

References

External links

Official homepage

Year of birth missing (living people)
Living people
British male singer-songwriters
British blues singers
British blues guitarists
21st-century British singers
Ruf Records artists
21st-century British male singers